Copper Lake is located in North Cascades National Park, in the U. S. state of Washington. Copper Lake lies along the route followed by the Copper Ridge Trail, which is accessed from a trailhead in Mount Baker National Forest. The hike to the lake is over  one-way and includes an altitude gain of almost .

References

Lakes of Washington (state)
North Cascades National Park
Lakes of Whatcom County, Washington